

Ion Ciuntu is a Moldovan politician.

Biography 

He served as member of the Parliament of Moldova and is a leader of the Democratic Forum of Romanians in Moldova.

See also 
 Metropolis of Bessarabia

External links 
 Cine au fost şi ce fac deputaţii primului Parlament din R. Moldova (1990-1994)?
 Declaraţia deputaţilor din primul Parlament
 Site-ul Parlamentului Republicii Moldova

References

Living people
Moldovan MPs 1990–1994
Popular Front of Moldova MPs
1954 births